Minuscule 942 (in the Gregory-Aland numbering), ε 1365 von Soden), is a 10th-century Greek minuscule manuscript of the New Testament on parchment. The manuscript has survived in complete condition.

Description 

The codex contains the text of the four Gospels on 385 parchment leaves (size ). The text is written in one column per page, 18 lines per page. The leaves are arranged in sedez.

It contains the Eusebian Canon tables, and pictures. There is no Epistula ad Carpianum. The manuscript is ornamented.

Text 

The Greek text of the codex is a representative of the Byzantine. Hermann von Soden classified it as text K. Kurt Aland placed it in Category V.
According to the Claremont Profile Method it represents textual Family Kx in Luke 1, Luke 10, and Luke 14.

History 

The manuscript was dated by Gregory to the 13th century. Currently it is dated by the INTF to the 10th century.

The codex 942 was seen by Gregory at the Dionysiou monastery (34), in Mount Athos. Currently 383 folios of the manuscript are housed at the Dionysiou monastery (121 (34)) in Athos. 2 folios are housed at the Russian National Library (Gr. 286) in St. Petersburg, they do not contain biblical text.

The manuscript was added to the list of New Testament manuscripts by C. R. Gregory (942e). It was not on the Scrivener's list, but it was added to this list by Edward Miller in the 4th edition of A Plain Introduction to the Criticism of the New Testament.

It was examined by Kurt Treu.

It is not cited in critical editions of the Greek New Testament (UBS4, NA28).

See also 

 List of New Testament minuscules (1–1000)
 Biblical manuscript
 Textual criticism

References

Further reading

External links 
 

Greek New Testament minuscules
10th-century biblical manuscripts
Athos manuscripts
Dionysiou Monastery